Prodelphinidin B9 is a prodelphinidin dimer found in beer.

References 

Condensed tannin dimers